Larissa Moreira Pacheco (born September 7, 1994) is a Brazilian mixed martial artist who competes in the Featherweight division of the PFL. Since 2020, Pacheco was ranked within the top 10 of the Women's Featherweight+ rankings by Fight Matrix, having been ranked as high as #7 from January to July 2020. She is currently ranked #3.

Mixed martial arts career

Early career

At the age of 15, Larissa found her love of martial arts when she began Muay Thai. Larissa began training on a daily basis, and a year later, she had her first amateur fight. Fighting 3 more times in 2012, in 2013, she fought 5 times, with Larissa entering Jungle Fight, and winning the Jungle Fight Women's Bantamweight Championship against Irene Aldana at Jungle Fight 63 .

Ultimate Fighting Championship

Pacheco made her UFC debut as an injury replacement for Valérie Létourneau, against Jéssica Andrade on September 13, 2014, at UFC Fight Night: Bigfoot vs. Arlovski. She lost the fight via submission in the first round.

Pacheco next faced future UFC Women's Featherweight Championship Germaine de Randamie at UFC 185 on March 14, 2015. She lost the fight via TKO in the second round, not before breaking her arm from a side kick from Germaine.

After suffering the broken arm, Larissa had to undergo a long recovery from the long-term damage and had to undergo 2 surgeries. She spent the next 3 years rehabilitating her arm, relocating to Rio de Janeiro where she taught Jiu Jitsu whilst planning her return to the MMA. During this time, Larissa was involved with Erica Paes social project that taught women self-defence and starred in popular Brazilian TV show A Força do Querer opposite famous actress Paolla Oliveira.

After this loss, she was released from the UFC.

Watch Out Combat Show

In 2018, Larissa was finally cleared to compete again, moving up to the Featherweight division and faced Karol Rosa at WOCS 49 in her first fight in 3 years. She won the bout in the second round via guillotine choke after having dominated the entire bout to become the first WOCS Female Featherweight champion.

The Ultimate Fighter
In August 2017, it was announced that Pacheco was one of the fighters featured on The Ultimate Fighter 28 UFC TV series.

Chiasson was the sixth pick of the featherweight fighters by coach Robert Whittaker.
 In the quarter-finals, she faced Macy Chiasson. She lost the fight via a technical knockout in round one.

Professional Fighters League

2019 season
Pacheco made her PFL debut against Kayla Harrison on May 9, 2019 at PFL 1. Pacheco lost the fight by unanimous decision.

Pacheco next faced Bobbi Jo Dalziel at PFL 4 on July 11, 2019. She won the bout via first round armbar.

Making it to the semifinals, Pacheco faced UFC vet Sarah Kaufman at PFL 7 on October 11, 2019. She won the fight via unanimous decision.

Pacheco rematched with Kayla Harrison in the Women's Lightweight final at PFL 10 on December 31, 2019. After being dominating every round by Kayla's superior grappling, Pacheco lost the fight by unanimous decision.

2021 season
Pacheco made her return to PFL against Julija Pajić at PFL 3 on May 6, 2021. She won the bout via TKO less than a minute into the bout after dropping Pajić in the first exchange.

Pacheco faced Olena Kolesnyk on June 25, 2021 at PFL 6. She won the bout via knockout in the first round.

Pacheco was scheduled to face Taylor Guardado in the Semifinals off the Women's Lightweight tournament on August 19, 2021 at PFL 8. At weigh-ins, she came in 2 pounds over the limit and was therefore removed from the tournament.

2022 season 
Pacheco faced Zamzagul Fayzallanova on May 6, 2022 at PFL 3. She won the bout via TKO stoppage in the first round.

Pacheco faced Genah Fabian on July 1, 2022 at PFL 6. She won the bout via TKO stoppage in the first round.

Pacheco faced Olena Kolesnyk in the Semifinals of the Women's Lightweight tournament on August 20, 2022 at PFL 9. She won the bout via first round TKO stoppage.

Pacheco faced Kayla Harrison for a third time in the finals of the Women's Lightweight tournament on November 25, 2022 at PFL 10. She won the fight via unanimous decision.

2023 season 
Pacheco will start of the 2023 season against Julia Budd on April 7, 2023 at PFL 2.

Championships and accomplishments
Professional Fighters League
2022 PFL Women's Lightweight Championship
Jungle Fight
 Jungle Fight Women's Bantamweight Championship (One time)
One successful defense
Watch Out Combat Show
WOCS Featherweight Championship (One time)
Sherdog
2022 Upset of the Year 
Cageside Press
2022 Upset of the Year

Mixed martial arts record

|-
|Win
|align=center|19–4
|Kayla Harrison
|Decision (unanimous)
|PFL 10
|
|align=center|5
|align=center|5:00
|New York City, New York, United States
|
|-
|Win
|align=center|18–4
|Olena Kolesnyk
|TKO (punches)
|PFL 9
|
|align=center|1
|align=center|2:09
|London, England
|
|-
|Win
|align=center|17–4
|Genah Fabian
|TKO (punches)
|PFL 6
|
|align=center|1
|align=center|2:39
|Atlanta, Georgia, United States
|
|-
|Win
|align=center|16–4
|Zamzagul Fayzallanova
|TKO (punches)
|PFL 3
|
|align=center|1
|align=center|1:25
|Arlington, Texas, United States
|
|-
|Win
|align=center|15–4
|Olena Kolesnyk
|KO (punch)
|PFL 6
|
|align=center|1
|align=center|4:48
|Atlantic City, New Jersey, United States
|
|-
|Win
|align=center|14–4
|Julija Pajic
|TKO (punches)
|PFL 3 
|
|align=center|1
|align=center|0:51
|Atlantic City, New Jersey, United States
|
|-
| Loss
| align=center| 13–4
| Kayla Harrison
|Decision (unanimous)
|PFL 10
|
|align=center|5
|align=center|5:00
|New York City, New York, United States
|.
|-
| Win
| align=center|13–3
|Sarah Kaufman
|Decision (unanimous)
|PFL 7
|
|align=center|3
|align=center|5:00
|Las Vegas, Nevada, United States
|.
|-
| Win
| align=center|12–3
|Bobbi Jo Dalziel
| Submission (armbar)
|PFL 4
|
|align=center|1
|align=center|2:31
|Atlantic City, New Jersey, United States
|
|-
| Loss
| align=center|11–3
|Kayla Harrison
|Decision (unanimous)
|PFL 1
|
|align=center|3
|align=center|5:00
|Uniondale, New York, United States
|
|-
| Win
| align=center| 11–2
| Karol Rosa
| Submission (guillotine choke)
| Watch Out Combat Show 49
| 
| align=center|2
| align=center|2:59
| Rio de Janeiro, Brazil
|
|-
| Loss
| align=center|10–2
| Germaine de Randamie
| TKO (punches)
| UFC 185
| 
| align=center| 2
| align=center| 2:02
| Dallas, Texas, United States
|
|-
| Loss
| align=center|10–1
| Jéssica Andrade
|Submission (guillotine choke)
|UFC Fight Night: Bigfoot vs. Arlovski
|
|align=center|1
|align=center|4:33
|Brasília, Brazil
|
|-
| Win
| align=center|10–0
| Lizianne Silveira
| Submission (triangle choke)
|Jungle Fight 68
|
| align=center|3
| align=center|2:25
|São Paulo, Brazil
|
|-
| Win
| align=center| 9–0
| Irene Aldana
|TKO (punches)
|Jungle Fight 63
|
|align=center| 3
|align=center| 1:50
|Belém, Brazil
|
|-
| Win
| align=center| 8–0
| Dinha Wollstaein
| TKO (punches)
| Jungle Fight 59
| 
| align=center| 1
| align=center| 0:36
| Rio de Janeiro, Brazil
| 
|-
| Win
| align=center| 7–0
| Monique Bastos
|Submission (keylock)
|Extreme Kombat 7
|
|align=center| 1
|align=center| 2:58
|Jacundá, Brazil
|
|-
| Win
| align=center|6–0
|Marcia Silva
|Submission (guillotine choke)
|Gladiador Fight 3
|
|align=center|2
|align=center|1:50
|Augusto Corrêa, Brazil
|
|-
| Win
| align=center|5–0
|Edileusa Correa
|Submission (triangle choke)
|Marituba Total Combat 1
|
|align=center|2
|align=center|2:00
|Marituba, Brazil
|
|-
| Win
| align=center| 4–0
| Thais Santana
|TKO (retirement)
|Ultimate Fight Imperatriz 3
|
|align=center|1
|align=center|2:00
|Imperatriz, Brazil
|
|-
| Win
| align=center|3–0
| Laura Goncalves Pacheco
|Submission (anaconda choke)
| Adrenalina Fight
|
| align=center|1
| align=center|1:30
|Ananindeua, Brazil
|
|-
| Win
| align=center| 2–0
| Alenice Correa Costa
| TKO (punches)
|Ultimate Fight Tracuateua
|
| align=center|1
| align=center|1:27
|Tracuateua, Brazil
|
|-
| Win
| align=center|1–0
| Raquel Pitbull
| Submission (armbar)
|Marituba Fight
|
|align=center|1
|align=center|1:30
|Marituba, Brazil
|

Mixed martial arts exhibition record

|-
|Loss
|align=center|0–1
|Macy Chiasson
|TKO (punches) 
| The Ultimate Fighter: Heavy Hitters
| (airdate)
|align=center|1
| align=center|3:48
|Las Vegas, Nevada, United States
|

See also 
 List of current PFL fighters
 List of female mixed martial artists

References

External links 
 Larissa Pacheco at PFL
 
 

1994 births
Living people
Brazilian female mixed martial artists
LGBT mixed martial artists
Lightweight mixed martial artists
Mixed martial artists utilizing Muay Thai
Ultimate Fighting Championship female fighters
Brazilian Muay Thai practitioners
Female Muay Thai practitioners
Sportspeople from Belém